Hyaluronan-binding protein 2 also known as factor VII activating protease (FSAP) is a protein that in humans is encoded by the HABP2 gene.

The protein encoded by this gene is an extracellular serine protease which binds hyaluronic acid. It is involved in cell adhesion. The protein is synthesized as a single chain, but then undergoes an autoproteolytic event to form the functional heterodimer. Further autoproteolysis leads to smaller, inactive peptides. Two transcript variants utilizing alternative polyA sites exist for this gene.

References

Further reading